Cteniopus sulphureus is a species of comb-clawed beetles belonging to the family Tenebrionidae subfamily Alleculinae.

These beetles are mainly present in Denmark, Finland, Slovenia, Italy and Sweden.

Elytra are pale yellow, while head and pronotum are orange-yellow. The shape of the head is extended forward. These thermophilic beetles can mainly be encountered in sunny places on inflorescences of Apiaceae and Asteraceae species, especially Achillea species.

Subspecies

Cteniopus sulphureus var. analis  Seidlitz 
Cteniopus sulphureus var. murinus  Herbst  
Cteniopus sulphureus var. palpalis  Seidlitz 
Cteniopus sulphureus var. sulphuratus  Gmelin

References

External links 
 Naturakivet
 Biolib
 Fauna Europaea

Alleculinae
Beetles of Europe
Beetles described in 1758
Taxa named by Carl Linnaeus